Springboard for the Arts is a not-for-profit arts service organization based in Saint Paul, Minnesota. Springboard for the Arts provides arts-related resources to independent artists and arts organizations including professional development education and workshops, fiscal sponsorship, micro-lending, health care resources, and career consultations.

History 
Originated in 1978 as a program of United Arts, it became an independent non-profit organization in 1991 under the name of Resources and Counseling for the Arts. The organization changed its name to Springboard for the Arts in 2002. Springboard also manages Minnesota Lawyers for the Arts (MnLA), the Minnesota chapter of Volunteer Lawyers for the Arts. Laura Zabel has been Executive Director since 2005.

In May 2020, the organization's building on University Avenue was among those damaged by arson during the George Floyd protests in Minneapolis–Saint Paul.

In 2021 their universal basic income for artists initiative was among the first in the nation. The funds will go to working artists in St. Paul's Rondo and Frogtown neighborhoods.

Research
In 2007, Springboard for the Arts partnered with Minnesota Citizens for the Arts and the Minnesota Craft Council to produce the economic impact study Artists Count: An Economic Impact Study of Artists in Minnesota. Following on this study, they purchased and converted a former auto showroom into a community hub called SpringBOX.

References

External links
Official website

Arts organizations based in Saint Paul, Minnesota
Non-profit organizations based in Minnesota
1978 establishments in Minnesota